The 1981 PGA Championship was the 63rd PGA Championship, held August 6–9 at Atlanta Athletic Club in Duluth, Georgia, a suburb northeast of Atlanta. Larry Nelson won the first of his three major titles, four strokes ahead of runner-up Fuzzy Zoeller.

Lee Trevino, 1974 champion, did not sign his scorecard after an opening round 74 and was disqualified after turning himself in. Bob Murphy led after each of the first two rounds, but was 8-over on the weekend and finished ten strokes back in 18th place. After a second consecutive 66 on Saturday, Nelson held the 54-hole lead, four strokes ahead of Zoeller

Tom Watson was the PGA Tour money list leader in August 1981, but missed the cut by a stroke.

It was the second major held at the Highlands Course, which hosted the U.S. Open in 1976. The PGA Championship returned in 2001 and 2011.

Past champions in the field

Made the cut

Missed the cut 

Source:

Round summaries

First round
Thursday, August 6, 1981

Source:

Second round
Friday, August 7, 1981

Source:

Third round
Saturday, August 8, 1981

Source:

Final round
Sunday, August 9, 1981

Source:

References

External links
PGA.com – 1981 PGA Championship 
Yahoo! Sports: 1981 PGA Championship leaderboard

PGA Championship
Golf in Georgia (U.S. state)
Sports in Duluth, Georgia
PGA Championship
PGA Championship
PGA Championship
PGA Championship